SMS Babenberg was a pre-dreadnought battleship built by the Austro-Hungarian Navy. She was launched on 4 October 1902 as the last of three s. Along with her sister ships, she participated at the bombardment of Ancona during World War I. At the end of the war, she was given to Great Britain as a war prize. She was scrapped in Italy in 1921.

Construction and layout 

Babenberg was the last of three battleships of her class. Her keel was laid down on 19 January 1901 at the Stabilimento Tecnico Triestino shipyard in Trieste. Following about a year and a half of construction, she was launched on 4 October 1902, when she was named by Countess Marianne von Goess, wife of the Statthalter of Trieste, Count Leopold von Goess. After final fitting-out work was completed, the ship was commissioned into the Austro-Hungarian fleet on 15 April 1904.

Freeboard was approximately  forward and about  aft. The ship also displaced . Once construction was finished, she was commissioned into the Navy with a crew of 638 officers and enlisted men.

Babenberg was powered by 2-shaft, 4-cylinder vertical triple expansion engines, which were supplied with steam by 16 Belleville boilers.

The hull for the ship was constructed from longitudinal and transverse steel frames, over which the outer hull plates were riveted into place. The hull incorporated a double bottom that ran for 63% of the ship's length. A series of watertight bulkheads also extended from the keel to the gun deck. All in all, there was a total of 174 watertight compartments in the ship. Bilge keels were mounted on either side of the hull to reduce rolling and prevent her from capsizing. Babenberg had a flush main deck that was planked with wood, while the upper decks were covered with linoleum or corticine.

Babenberg had three  L/40 guns, two mounted in a twin turret forward and one mounted in a single turret aft of the main superstructure. The C 97-type guns were manufactured by Krupp in Germany. The main guns fired at a rate of between three and four  armor-piercing (AP) shells per minute. Her secondary armament consisted of twelve  SK L/40 guns in casemates. These guns could fire at 4–5 shells per minute. Babenberg was built with face-hardened chrome-nickel steel.

Service history

Peacetime 

Following a series of simulated wargames against the three  battleships, Babenberg and the other two Habsburg-class ships became the I Battleship Division. With the commissioning of the s in 1906 and 1907, the Habsburg-class battleships were transferred from the I to the II Battleship Division, and the three Monarch-class battleships were moved from the II to the III Battleship Division.

World War I 

During World War I, Babenberg served with the IV Division of the Austro-Hungarian Navy's battleships and along with her sister ships Habsburg and Árpád and the remainder of the Austro-Hungarian Navy. The two German ships were stationed in the Mediterranean and were attempting to break out of the strait of Messina, which was surrounded by British troops and vessels and make their way to the Ottoman Empire. After the Germans successfully broke out of Messina, the navy was recalled. The fleet had by that time advanced as far south as Brindisi in southeastern Italy. Babenberg and her sister ships also participated in the Bombardment of Ancona after the Italian declaration of war on the Central Powers. Towards the end of the war, the ship was decommissioned and was retained as a harbor defense ship. Following the end of the war, the ship was awarded to Great Britain as a war prize, but was instead sold and broken up for scrapping in Italy in 1921.

Footnotes 

Explanatory notes

Citations

References 

 
 
 
 
 
 
 
 
 

Habsburg-class battleships
Ships built in Trieste
1902 ships
World War I battleships of Austria-Hungary